is a Japanese politician of the Constitutional Democratic Party and a member of the House of Councillors in the Diet (national legislature). Ogawa is a former Minister of Justice. A native of Nerima, Tokyo, and a graduate of Rikkyo University, he was elected to the House of Councillors for the first time in 1998 after working as a prosecutor.

Political career 

In 1996, he ran for a lower house seat with support from the Democratic Party of Japan, but failed. In 1998, he ran for an upper house election, and was elected. In 2004, he again got elected in an upper house election. In 2012, he was appointed justice minister.

He was re-elected in 2004, 2010 and 2016, and is currently the longest serving councillor from Tokyo. When the Democratic Party merged with Kibō no Tō to form the DPP in May 2018, Ogawa did not join the new party and decided to join the CDP instead.

References

External links 
 Official website

|-

|-

1948 births
Constitutional Democratic Party of Japan politicians
Democratic Party of Japan politicians
Ministers of Justice of Japan
20th-century Japanese  judges
Japanese prosecutors
Japanese racehorse owners and breeders
Living people
Members of the House of Councillors (Japan)
Politicians from Tokyo
Rikkyo University alumni